The Blue Fox is a 2003 novel by Icelandic writer Sjón. The book was originally published by Bjartur and first published in the United States in 2013.

Plot
The book takes place in Iceland in 1883. It opens with a priest hunting a blue fox, then jumps backward to the days leading up to the hunt. An herbalist buries the recently deceased woman with Down syndrome that he rescued from a shipwreck. It details their life together before returning to the present. The priest shoots and kills the mysterious blue fox he is hunting, but the sound from his rifle causes an avalanche. While trapped underneath the snow in a glacial cave, the priest starts to go insane. The fox comes back to life and argues with him about the invention of electricity and the priest kills the fox a second time, this time skinning her and wearing her fur. He then transforms into a blue fox himself. The book ends with a letter from the herbalist, who explains the girl with Down syndrome was the priest's daughter, whom he sold into slavery several years before the herbalist rescued her.

Reception

It won the Nordic Council Literature Prize in 2005. It was a finalist for the Jan Michalski Prize for Literature (2011).

See also
 2003 in literature
 Icelandic literature

References

2003 novels
Icelandic novels
Fiction set in 1883
Novels set in the 1880s
Nordic Council's Literature Prize-winning works
Icelandic-language novels